North Slavey may mean,
Sahtu, formerly the North Slavey people
Slavey language, language spoken by the Sahtu